James Ransom (born 2 April 1971) is a Canadian fencer. He competed in the individual and team épée events at the 1996 Summer Olympics.

References

External links
 

1971 births
Living people
Canadian male épée fencers
Olympic fencers of Canada
Fencers at the 1996 Summer Olympics
Sportspeople from Toronto